Maria Judea "Maki" Jimenez Pulido (born May 20, 1972) is a Filipino journalist and one of the two host of Reporter's Notebook, a current affairs programme on the Philippines terrestrial television channel GMA Network with Jiggy Manicad (now replaced by Jun Veneracion). Pulido is an anchor for the afternoon daily newscast on GMA News TV entitled Balita Pilipinas Ngayon, alongside Mark Salazar.

Personal life
Pulido is the daughter of Alice and Nestor Pulido. Alice Pulido was the former Mayor of Anda, a town in Pangasinan of the Philippines. Nestor Pulido, Maki's father and Alice Pulido's husband, is also the former Mayor of Anda. She has a daughter and son of her own.

Professional life
Pulido became a household name when the whole nation watched her run across Malacaňang (the official residence of the Presidential Family) to her camera crew, keen on delivering the exclusive update on the Estrada family behind Palace gates. Her passion for the news extends to covering significant national issues. At the close of the Subic rape trial in December 2006, Pulido was again running in her effort to deliver the latest on the convicted US Marine as he was brought to the detention center, amid pressure from the foreigner's security escorts.

Pulido's zeal for reporting has won her both local and international acclaim. Her in-depth report on Filipinos who illegally enter Malaysia through the country's “Backdoor" won the Silver Screen Award at the 2005 US International Film and Video Festival. The same story was also highly commended at the Asian TV Awards the same year. In 2007, the US International Film and Video Festival awarded third place to her reports entitled “Slaughterhouse" and “Trigger". She has also had the honor of having two of her stories, “Batang Kargador" (Child Haulers) and “Sex Slaves" named Finalists at the New York Film Festival. In 2008 she won the Gold World Medal for Best Human Interest Story for Batang Kalakal.

Congressional elections
She resigned as a journalist in late 2009 to run for a seat in the First legislative district of Pangasinan under the PMP Party. She lost to former Bolinao Mayor Jesus Celeste  and vowed never to run again for any election. In 2013, her brother Leonido lost to Celeste.

References

1972 births
Living people
Filipino television journalists
University of the Philippines alumni
People from Pangasinan
GMA Network personalities
GMA Integrated News and Public Affairs people